Sisak Synagogue was the 19th century synagogue in Sisak, Croatia built in the 1880. During World War II it was devastated and robbed, and synagogue rabbi Beno Heisz was killed in 1943. Synagogue today serves as a music school.

Gallery

References

Ashkenazi Jewish culture in Croatia
Ashkenazi synagogues
Synagogues completed in 1880
Former synagogues in Croatia
Sisak
Buildings and structures in Sisak-Moslavina County
Buildings and structures demolished in 1942